Rahal (also Romanized as Rahāl) is a village in Rahal Rural District, in the Central District of Khoy County, West Azerbaijan Province, Iran. At the 2006 census, its population was 958, in 234 families.

References 

Populated places in Khoy County